The Australian Psychological Society (APS) is one of the professional associations for psychologists in Australia. The APS had more than 27,000 members in 2005, making it the largest professional body representing psychologists in Australia at that time. The Society's Code of Ethics was adopted in 2007 and became the Code of Ethics for the profession in Australia in 2010 when it was taken up by the newly formed Psychology Board of Australia. The APS also provides members with recommendations of appropriate fees to charge for their professional services.

Membership 
Eligibility for full membership MAPS of the APS is not unduly complicated (see the website for details). In most cases, full, general registration as a psychologist with the Australian Health Practitioner Regulation Agency (AHPRA) will ensure eligibility.

Other levels of membership are available, such as associate membership of MAPS, for psychologists with provisional registration with AHPRA.  Undergraduate students studying any APAC accredited psychology units are eligible to become APS student subscribers. This subscription is dependent on continuing study in psychology.

Ethics 
All Australian psychologists are bound by the APS Code of Ethics. The code was adopted by the registering authority, The Psychology Board of Australia (PsyBA), in 2010. The PsyBA works together with AHPRA to register psychologists.  In Australia, the term psychologist is legally protected and only those registered with AHPRA may use it. Registration with any other professional body, such as the APS, is optional.

Presidents
The following have been Presidents of the Society.

Events 
The APS promotes and facilitates psychology-related events. The APS also regularly attends a number of national conferences as a participant.

Journals 
The APS publishes three journals with Wiley: Australian Journal of Psychology, Australian Psychologist and Clinical Psychologist.

Education and training 

The APS has nine colleges; these are in the internationally recognised specialised areas of neuropsychology, forensic, community, health, clinical, counselling, educational and developmental, organisational, and sport and exercise psychology.

In 2009, APAC (Australian Psychology Accreditation Council) developed a new 5th year postgraduate diploma in professional practice. This training model has been introduced via the "5+1" pathway as a transitional alternative to the retiring "4+2" system that has been in place for many years as a basic standard for registration as a psychologist in Australia. This is reflective of the ultimate goal to set the minimum requirement of registration at the master's degree level. The new 5+1 pathway incorporates a five-year university sequence in psychology training, followed by one year accredited workplace supervision.

As of 2010, the Psychology Board of Australia became the sole agency responsible for the registration of psychologists across Australia. The Board adopted the APS Code of Ethics for all members of the profession.

See also
American Psychological Association
Australian Counselling Association
Psychotherapy and Counselling Federation of Australia
Psychologists Board of Queensland

Notes

References

External links 
 
 Psychology Board of Australia website

Psychology-related professional associations
Psychology organisations based in Australia
1966 establishments in Australia
National Rural Health Alliance organisations